Mahir Yousef is a Qatari footballer who plays as a forward. He currently plays as a forward. He is a capped member of the Qatar national football team.

References

Living people
1988 births
Qatari footballers
El Jaish SC players
Umm Salal SC players
Qatar SC players
Al Kharaitiyat SC players
Al-Wakrah SC players
Al-Sailiya SC players
Mesaimeer SC players
Al Bidda SC players
Al-Markhiya SC players
Qatar international footballers
Association football forwards
Qatar Stars League players
Qatari Second Division players